Iberis linifolia is a herbaceous annual flowering plant of the genus Iberis and the family Brassicaceae.

Synonyms 
 Biauricula dunalii Bubani
 Biauricula intermedia (Guers.) Lunell
 Biauricula linifolia (L.) Bubani
 Iberis boppardensis Jord.
 Iberis contejeanii Billot
 Iberis dunalii (Bubani) Cadevall & Sallent
 Iberis intermedia Guers.
 Iberis intermedia subsp. beugesiaca J.-M. Tison
 Iberis intermedia subsp. boppardensis (Jord.) Korneck
 Iberis intermedia subsp. dunalii (Bubani) O. Bolòs & Vigo
 Biauricula dunalii Bubani 
 Biauricula intermedia (Guers.) Lunell 
 Biauricula linifolia (L.) Bubani 
 Iberis boppardensis Jord. 
 Iberis contejeanii Billot 
 Iberis dunalii  (Bubani) Cadevall & Sallent 
 Iberis intermedia Guers. 
 Iberis intermedia subsp. beugesiaca J.-M. Tison 
 Iberis intermedia subsp. boppardensis (Jord.) Korneck 
 Iberis intermedia subsp. dunalii (Bubani) O. Bolòs & Vigo 
 Iberis linifolia subsp. timeroyi (Jord.) Moreno 
 Iberis prostii Soy.-Will. ex Godr. 
 Iberis soyeri Bonnier & Layens 
 Iberis timeroyi Jord.

Description
It has very narrow leaves and pinkish flowers, about 9 mm wide. The flowering period extends from July to September.

Distribution
This species is present in France and Italy.

Habitat

References

linifolia
Plants described in 1759
Taxa named by Carl Linnaeus